V. Balachandran was an Indian politician and former Member of the Legislative Assembly. He was elected to the Tamil Nadu legislative assembly as a Hindu Munnani supported independent candidate  from Padmanabhapuram constituency in Kanyakumari district in 1984 election.

References 

People from Kanyakumari district
Indian National Congress politicians from Tamil Nadu
Living people
Year of birth missing (living people)

Tamil Nadu MLAs 1985–1989